Marche Airport , formerly Ancona Falconara Airport, is an airport serving Ancona and the Marche region of central Italy. It was also known as Raffaello Sanzio Airport, named after Raffaello Sanzio (1483–1520), the Italian painter and architect.

History
During World War II, Falconara Airfield was a military airfield used by the United States Army Air Forces Twelfth Air Force for B-25 Mitchell combat operations by the 321st Bombardment Group between 1 Apr and 1 Sep 1945. After the war ended, the airfield was turned over to local authorities.

Facilities

Airlines and destinations

Passenger

The following airlines operate scheduled services:

Cargo
The following cargo services are operated at the airport:

Statistics

Ground transportation

Aerobus
The airport is connected to Ancona and Falconara Marittima via piazza Cavour, piazza Kennedy, Ancona railway station, Ancona Torrette railway station, Falconara Marittima railway station, normally in coincidence with the operating flights.

Car
The airport is found on Strada statale 76 della Val d'Esino in directions of both Jesi and Falconara Marittima. People travelling on the Autostrada A14 need to exit at "Ancona Nord" and join Strada statale 76 della Val d'Esino.

Railway
A small railway station, Castelferretti-Falconara Aeroporto, is situated just outside the airport. Regional trains bound to Ancona, Jesi, Fabriano, Foligno, Orte and Rome departs from there.

References

Further reading

 Maurer, Maurer. Air Force Combat Units of World War II. Maxwell AFB, Alabama: Office of Air Force History, 1983. 521p. .

External links

 Official website
 
 

Airports in Italy
Ancona
Transport in le Marche
Buildings and structures in le Marche
Falconara Marittima